Sally Roberts is a veteran of the war in Afghanistan, national champion wrestler, and founder of non-profit Wrestle Like a Girl.

Early life and education
Roberts was the first in her family to graduate from high school.  She went on to receive a Bachelor of Arts in Psychology from the University of Colorado, Colorado Springs, as well as a Master of Arts in Sport and Performance Psychology from the University of the Rockies.

Military service
Roberts joined the Army in 2009, and served with the 320th Psychological Operations Company.  Roberts volunteered for a deployment to Afghanistan, and later joined the U.S. Army World Class Athlete Program.

Wrestling
Roberts' wrestling career began in eighth grade, when she was given a choice between juvenile detention and an after-school activity.  She earned her first gold medal at the Keystone Open in 1999, the same year she first placed in both U.S. National and World team trials.  Roberts ultimately became a two-time World bronze medal winner and three-time U.S. National Champion.

Activism
Roberts founded Wrestle Like a Girl, a non-profit that seeks to provide resources for female wrestlers.  She advocates for NCAA recognition of female wrestling, which would provide access to benefits such as health insurance and scholarships currently available to male wrestlers only.

References

Living people
1980 births
American female sport wrestlers
Nonprofit chief executives
American activists
United States Army personnel of the War in Afghanistan (2001–2021)
World Wrestling Championships medalists
21st-century American women
U.S. Army World Class Athlete Program